Neodrillia crassa is a species of sea snail, a marine gastropod mollusk in the family Drilliidae.

Description
The length of the shell varies between 7 mm and 21 mm.

Distribution
This marine species occurs off Barbados, Dominica, Guadeloupe and the Netherlands Antilles.

References

External links
 Fallon P.J. (2016). Taxonomic review of tropical western Atlantic shallow water Drilliidae (Mollusca: Gastropoda: Conoidea) including descriptions of 100 new species. Zootaxa. 4090(1): 1–363
 

crassa
Gastropods described in 2016